Norwalk Transit is a municipal transit company providing fixed-route and paratransit bus transit services in Norwalk, California, United States, and also operates in portions of Artesia, Bellflower, Cerritos, La Habra, La Mirada, Santa Fe Springs, and Whittier in southeast Los Angeles County and northwestern Orange County.

Norwalk Transit receives its operating revenue from farebox receipts and state tax revenue distributed by the Los Angeles County Metropolitan Transportation Authority.

Bus routes 
Norwalk Transit operates a connector shuttle bus service between the Norwalk/Santa Fe Springs Transportation Center and the Norwalk Station on the Metro C Line.

Presently, Metrolink (commuter rail service between Orange County and Los Angeles) provides weekday train service to the Norwalk/Santa Fe Springs Transportation Center. The rail feeder service implemented by Norwalk Transit provides direct interconnectivity between rail stations (Metrolink – commuter rail and Metro C Line light rail).

Norwalk Transit's paratransit dial-a-ride service operates within the jurisdictional boundary of the City of Norwalk.

History 
Norwalk Transit began operation in 1974, a project done by Mayor John Zimmerman Jr.

In 2005, Norwalk Transit began operating Whittier Transit service under contract. The two routes were combined into Norwalk Transit route 7 in 2007, which was discontinued on 19 September 2011 during a series of cuts to Norwalk Transit. As of 27 June 2016 Route 7 returned in operation.

Fleet information 
The standard fleet is composed mainly of Gillig LF and New Flyer GE40LF vehicles.

References

External links 
Norwalk Transit Web Site
Los Angeles County Metropolitan Transit Authority

Bus transportation in California
Public transportation in Los Angeles County, California
Norwalk, California
Bellflower, California
Cerritos, California
La Mirada, California
Whittier, California